Elizabeth McDonald is an American painter.

McDonald lives in Glasgow, Scotland.  She received an M.F.A. from the Glasgow School of Art. McDonald won the Young Artist Award at the 2010 BP Portrait Awards in the National Portrait Gallery, London. Her work was exhibited at the 500x Gallery Dallas, Texas in 2010, and at the Chalet Invitational Glasgow the same year. In addition, McDonald was shown at the John Moores Contemporary Painting Exhibition in 2010.

References

External links
  BP Portrait Award
 Lola Dupre's portrait of the artist Elizabeth McDonald
 Elizabeth McDonald Artist

Living people
21st-century American women artists
American women painters
Alumni of the Glasgow School of Art
Year of birth missing (living people)